Mimocolliuris is a genus of beetles in the family Carabidae, containing the following species:

 Mimocolliuris andrewesi (Liebke, 1933) 
 Mimocolliuris bakeri (Liebke, 1933) 
 Mimocolliuris chaudoiri Boheman, 1858
 Mimocolliuris insulana Habu, 1979
 Mimocolliuris nepalensis Jedlicka, 1965 
 Mimocolliuris pilifera (Nietner, 1858) 
 Mimocolliuris pusilla (Andrewes, 1930) 
 Mimocolliuris sauteri Liebke, 1933 
 Mimocolliuris stigma (Andrewes, 1923)

References

Lebiinae